In computer networking, IP over Avian Carriers (IPoAC) is a joke proposal to carry Internet Protocol (IP) traffic by birds such as homing pigeons.  IP over Avian Carriers was initially described in  issued by the Internet Engineering Task Force (IETF), written by D. Waitzman, and released on April 1, 1990.  It is one of several April Fools' Day Request for Comments.

Later, in —released on 1 April 2011, and 13 years after the introduction of IPv6—Brian Carpenter and Robert Hinden published Adaptation of RFC 1149 for IPv6.

Thus, this technology suffers from high latency.

Real-life implementation 
On 28 April 2001, IPoAC was implemented by the Bergen Linux user group, under the name CPIP (for Carrier Pigeon Internet Protocol). They sent nine packets over a distance of approximately five kilometers (three miles), each carried by an individual pigeon and containing one ping (ICMP Echo Request), and received four responses.

Script started on Sat Apr 28 11:24:09 2001
$ /sbin/ifconfig tun0
tun0      Link encap:Point-to-Point Protocol
          inet addr:10.0.3.2  P-t-P:10.0.3.1  Mask:255.255.255.255
          UP POINTOPOINT RUNNING NOARP MULTICAST  MTU:150  Metric:1
          RX packets:1 errors:0 dropped:0 overruns:0 frame:0
          TX packets:2 errors:0 dropped:0 overruns:0 carrier:0
          collisions:0
          RX bytes:88 (88.0 b)  TX bytes:168 (168.0 b)

$ ping -c 9 -i 900 10.0.3.1
PING 10.0.3.1 (10.0.3.1): 56 data bytes
64 bytes from 10.0.3.1: icmp_seq=0 ttl=255 time=6165731.1 ms
64 bytes from 10.0.3.1: icmp_seq=4 ttl=255 time=3211900.8 ms
64 bytes from 10.0.3.1: icmp_seq=2 ttl=255 time=5124922.8 ms
64 bytes from 10.0.3.1: icmp_seq=1 ttl=255 time=6388671.9 ms

--- 10.0.3.1 ping statistics ---
9 packets transmitted, 4 packets received, 55% packet loss
round-trip min/avg/max = 3211900.8/5222806.6/6388671.9 ms

Script done on Sat Apr 28 14:14:28 2001

This real life implementation was mentioned by the French MP Martine Billard in the French Assemblée Nationale, during debates about Hadopi.
The implementation was noted in the song "Paper Pings" by Steve Savitzky.

Risks 
In December 2005, a Gartner report on bird flu that concluded "A pandemic wouldn't affect IT systems directly" was humorously criticized for neglecting to consider RFC 1149 and RFC 2549 in its analysis.

Known risks to the protocol include:
 Carriers being attacked by birds of prey. RFC2549: "Unintentional encapsulation in hawks has been known to occur, with decapsulation being messy and the packets mangled."
 Carriers being blown off course. RFC1149: "While broadcasting is not specified, storms can cause data loss."
 The absence of viable local carriers. RFC6214: "In some locations, such as New Zealand, a significant proportion of carriers are only able to execute short hops, and only at times when the background level of photon emission is extremely low." This describes the flightless and nocturnal nature of kiwis.
 Loss of availability of species, such as the extinction of the passenger pigeon.
 Disease affecting the carriers. RFC6214: "There is a known risk of infection by the so-called H5N1 virus."
 The network topologies supported for multicast communication are limited by the homing abilities of carriers. RFC6214: "... [carriers] prove to have no talent for multihoming, and in fact enter a routing loop whenever multihoming is attempted."

Other avian data transfer methods 
Rafting photographers already use pigeons as a sneakernet to transport digital photos on flash media from the camera to the tour operator. Over a 30-mile distance, a single pigeon may be able to carry tens of gigabytes of data in around an hour, which on an average bandwidth basis compares very favorably to current ADSL standards, even when accounting for lost drives.

An effective throughput of 2.27 Mbps was achieved. The purpose of the test was to measure and confirm an improvement over RFC 2549. Since the developers used flash memory instead of paper notes as specified by RFC 2549, the experiment was widely criticized as an example in which an optimized implementation breaks an official standard.

Inspired by RFC 2549, on 9 September 2009, the marketing team of The Unlimited, a regional company in South Africa, decided to host a tongue-in-cheek pigeon race between their pet pigeon Winston and local telecom company Telkom SA. The pigeon carried a microSD card and competed against a Telkom ADSL line. Winston beat the data transfer over Telkom's ADSL line, with a total time of two hours, six minutes and 57 seconds from uploading data on the microSD card to completion of download from card. At the time of Winston's victory, the ADSL transfer was just under 4% complete.

In November 2009, the Australian comedy/current-affairs television program Hungry Beast repeated this experiment. The Hungry Beast team took up the challenge after a fiery parliament session wherein the government of the time blasted the opposition for not supporting telecommunications investments, saying that if the opposition had their way, Australians would be doing data transfer over carrier pigeons. The Hungry Beast team had read about the South African experiment and assumed that, as a developed western country, Australia would have higher speeds. The experiment had the team transfer a 700MB file via three delivery methods to determine which was the fastest: A carrier pigeon with a microSD card, a car carrying a USB Stick, and a Telstra (Australia's largest telecom provider) ADSL line. Approximately halfway through the race, the internet connection unexpectedly dropped and the transfer had to be restarted. The pigeon won the race with a time of approximately 1 hour 5 minutes, the car came in second at 2 hours 10 minutes, while the internet transfer did not finish, having dropped out a second time and not coming back. The estimated time to upload completion at one point was as high as 9 hours, and at no point did the estimated upload time fall below 4 hours.

A similar pigeon race was conducted in September 2010 by tech blogger (trefor.net) and ISP Timico CTO Trefor Davies with farmer Michelle Brumfield in rural Yorkshire, England: delivering a five-minute video to a BBC correspondent 75 miles away in Skegness. The pigeon was pitted (carrying a memory card with a 300MB HD video of Davies having a haircut) against an upload to YouTube via British Telecom broadband; the pigeon was released at 11:05 am and arrived in the loft one hour and fifteen minutes later while the upload was still incomplete, having failed once in the interim.

See also 
 Hyper Text Coffee Pot Control Protocol
 Pigeon post
 Semaphore Flag Signaling System
 Sneakernet

References

External links 
 "Carrier Pigeons Bringing Contraband into Prisons", Bruce Schneier, www.schneier.com (blog), June 27, 2008
 Pigeon-powered Internet takes flight, Stephen Shankland, CNET News, May 4, 2001
 "The Unlimited"
 Pigeon carries data bundles faster than Telkom, 10 Sep 2009, M&G
 RFC1149 Game

April Fools' Day jokes
Computer humor
Internet architecture
Link protocols
Physical layer protocols
Wireless networking
Domestic pigeons